Poradah Junction railway station is a railway junction located in Kushtia District, Bangladesh.

History
The British Raj government laid the first railway line from Calcutta to Jagati via Poradah on 15 November 1862. Later, the Poradah–Bheramara railway line opened by 1878, making Poradah railway station a junction. The Benapole Express train running from Dhaka to Benapole takes a break at Poradah Junction.

References

External link
 

Railway stations in Kushtia District
Railway junction stations in Bangladesh
Railway stations opened in 1862
1862 establishments in British India